Shahana Goswami is an Indian actress. She is the daughter of Indian economist and writer Omkar Goswami.

Career

Through her theater circle Goswami met talent consultant Shaanu Sharma who asked her to audition for a role in Naseeruddin Shah's directorial debut Yun Hota Toh Kya Hota. Subsequently, she stumbled upon the small role of Boman Irani's daughter in Reema Kagti's Honeymoon Travels Pvt. Ltd., when she visited the production house for some other work. Meanwhile, a cinematographer who noticed her work in Yun Hota Toh Kya Hota recommended her and she auditioned for the lead role in Percept Picture Company's Ru Ba Ru, directed by Arjun Bali, with Randeep Hooda as her co-star. For Goswami, Ru Ba Ru happened while she was still in college completing her graduation. She gave her first shot for the film in Bangkok, much before she was signed on for Rock On!!.

Her friends Shaanu Sharma and Simran, who were in the middle of casting for Rock On!!, at that time suggested her name to the film's director, Abhishek Kapoor. Later, she auditioned for the film and got her big break in the role of Debbie. Her performance earned her the Filmfare Best Actress (Critics) award.

She then appeared in the music video for Dido's Let's Do the Things We Normally Do as a taxi driver in Mumbai. The video was shot by Siddharth Sikand. In between, she also featured in a Fevicol commercial set in a village in Rajasthan.

Goswami's first international project was Deepa Mehta's Midnight's Children (2013), an adaptation of Salman Rushdie's Booker Prize winning novel.

Goswami played the female lead in Vara: A Blessing directed by Khyentse Norbu (director of The Cup and Travellers & Magicians, which was shot in Sri Lanka. She received the Asian Award for best actress for her performance in the film.

Goswami will be next seen in the upcoming web series 'Bombay Begums', directed by Alankrita Shrivastava. Starring Pooja Bhatt, Amruta Subhash, Plabita Borthakur and Aadhya Anand.

Filmography

Television

Awards

References

External links

 
 
 

Living people
Year of birth missing (living people)
Indian film actresses
Indian television actresses
Indian web series actresses
Actresses in Hindi cinema
Actresses from Mumbai
Actresses from New Delhi
Bengali people
Sophia College for Women alumni
Filmfare Awards winners
Screen Awards winners
21st-century Indian actresses